The 2002 Winnipeg Blue Bombers finished in second place in the West Division with a 12–6 record. Due to the Ottawa Renegades entering the league, the Blue Bombers moved back to the West Division. They appeared in the West Final, but lost to the Edmonton Eskimos.

Offseason

CFL Draft

Regular season

Season standings

Season schedule

Playoffs

West Semi-Final

West Final

Awards and records
CFL's Most Outstanding Player Award – Milt Stegall (SB)

2002 CFL All-Stars
RB – Charles Roberts, CFL All-Star
SB – Milt Stegall, CFL All-Star
OT – Dave Mudge, CFL All-Star
DT – Doug Brown, CFL All-Star
DT – Denny Fortney, CFL All-Star

Western All-Star selections
QB – Khari Jones, CFL Western All-Star
RB – Charles Roberts, CFL Western All-Star
SB – Milt Stegall, CFL Western All-Star
OT – Dave Mudge, CFL Western All-Star
DT – Doug Brown, CFL Western All-Star
DT – Denny Fortney, CFL Western All-Star
DB – Harold Nash, CFL Western All-Star
DS – Tom Europe, CFL Western All-Star

References

Winnipeg Blue Bombers
Winnipeg Blue Bombers seasons